Narrows Pond is actually two small twin lakes in Winthrop, Maine.  They are Upper and Lower Narrows Pond, and are divided by a very narrow isthmus, hence the name.  The isthmus is traversed by Narrows Pond Road, and a culvert connects the two lakes.  People in canoes or kayaks can travel between the two lakes, though only by ducking first.

Both lakes' shores are lined with cottages, most of them summer residences.  Seaplanes are allowed to land and take off from the Upper Pond.  A Methodist summer camp is located on the Lower Pond.

External links 

Lakes of Kennebec County, Maine
Lakes of Maine